= Kathryn Hendley =

American professor of law and politics (born 1958)

Kathryn Hendley (born 1958) is an American professor of law and politics, and is currently the William Voss-Bascom Professor of Law and Political Science at the University of Wisconsin–Madison.

Hendley received her Ph.D. the University of California - Berkeley and her J.D. from the University of California - Los Angeles. Hendley's research focuses on legal and economic reform in the former Soviet Union. She is currently engaged in an inter-disciplinary project aimed at understanding how business is conducted in Russia and the role of law in business transactions and corporate governance. This project has been funded by the World Bank, the National Science Foundation, and the National Council for Eurasian and East European Research. She teaches Contracts, as well as courses related to her interest in Russia, such as Russian Law, International Business Transactions, Comparative Law, and Transitions to the Market. She has served as a consultant to the U.S. Agency for International Development and the World Bank in their work on legal reform in Russia. Hendley is a former director of University of Wisconsin–Madison's Center for Russia, East Europe and Central Asia, which receives Title VI funding from the U.S. Department of Education.
